"Eternally" is a song with music by Charles (Charlie) Chaplin, and words by the English lyricists Geoff Parsons and John Turner. The music was initially composed for Chaplin's film Limelight (1952) and titled "Terry's Theme"; the film won an Oscar for "Best Original Dramatic Score" at the 45th Academy Awards in 1973.

"Terry's Theme"

As "Terry's Theme", the tune was a charting instrumental hit in 1953 for Frank Chacksfield (UK number 2, US number 5), Ron Goodwin (UK number 3), and Richard Hayman (US number 13).

"Eternally"
As "Eternally", it was recorded by Jimmy Young (UK number 8, 1953), Vic Damone (US number 12, 1953), Li Xianglan (in Chinese and Japanese), Petula Clark (These Are My Songs, 1967), Bing Crosby (for his radio show), Dinah Shore, Steve Lawrence, Michel Legrand, Jerry Vale, Sarah Vaughan, Roger Whittaker, Engelbert Humperdinck (1973 and 2007), Victor Wood (1971), Amália Rodrigues, John Serry Sr. (Squeeze Play, 1956), among many others.

"Candilejas"
Brazilian singer José Augusto recorded Portuguese and Spanish language versions of the song; the Spanish version, titled "Candilejas", topped the charts in Mexico in 1974.

See also
List of number-one hits of 1974 (Mexico)

References

External links

Compositions by Charlie Chaplin
Songs written for films
1952 songs
1953 singles
Petula Clark songs
Songs with lyrics by Geoffrey Parsons (lyricist)
Songs with lyrics by John Turner (lyricist)
Music published by Bourne Co. Music Publishers